Damphu is the administrative headquarters and capital of Tsirang District, Bhutan. It is located on the north–south highway running from Wangdue Phodrang to Sarpang and Gelephu on the border with India. It contains the Tsirang Dzong.

At the 2005 census, its population was 1,666.

References 

Populated places in Bhutan